William Sefa Ntiamoah is a Ghanaian Cinematographer.

Awards 
Nominee for Achievement in Cinematography with the movie Getting Married and DÉJÀ VU under cinematography nomination list at the Ghana Movie Awards.

Filmography

References 

Living people
Year of birth missing (living people)